Werner Wilhelm Franke (31 January 1940 – 14 November 2022) was a German biologist and a professor of cell and molecular biology at the German Cancer Research Center in Heidelberg. He was an anti-doping pioneer in Germany.

Life 
Franke was born in Paderborn on 31 January 1940. After completing high school (Abitur at Gymnasium Theodorianum), he studied chemistry, biology and physics at the University of Heidelberg. Following completion of his doctorate (Heidelberg) and habilitation (Freiburg) he became a university professor in Heidelberg and, at the same time, became the head of a department at the German Cancer Research Center. In 1982, Franke became the president of the European Cell Biology Organization (ECBO), a post he held until 1990. His main research field was the molecular characterization of the cytoskeleton in normal and transformed cells. He was also a doping expert.

Franke died on 14 November 2022 from an intracerebral hemorrhage, at age 82.

Drug abuse in sports
Franke is considered to have been a leading expert in performance-enhancing drugs and one of the most ardent critics of drug abuse in sports. Together with his wife, Brigitte Berendonk, once an Olympic discus thrower and shot putter, he fought against drug abuse in sports. He assisted his wife in researching the 1991 book Doping: From Research to Deceit, uncovering the systematic use of doping by East German athletes.

Franke defended cyclist Danilo Hondo after the banned substance Carphedon was found in his blood during the 2005 Vuelta a Murcia. Franke argued that the amount found in his blood was "laughably small" and that "you can only get this medication through certain channels in Russia or China, where it is used by the military and the space flight programs."

During an interview on 3 August 2006 with German regional television channel , Franke claimed that cyclist Jan Ullrich purchased about €35,000 worth of doping products a year to Eufemiano Fuentes based on documents uncovered in the Operación Puerto doping case. A German court imposed a gag order on Franke after it found there was not enough evidence to link Ullrich to doping. However, that case returned to court with DNA analysis linking Ullrich to nine bags of blood seized in the Puerto case, and eventually after four years, Franke won the case.

Awards
 1981 Meyenburg Prize
 1984 Ernst Jung Prize
 2004 Order of Merit of the Federal Republic of Germany

Memberships
 1977 European Molecular Biology Organization (EMBO)
 1986 Heidelberg Academy of Sciences and Humanities
 1988 Honorary Member of the American Association for Anatomy
 1989 Academia Europaea

Works

Cell biology
Franke is author and co-author of  660 original articles in the field of cell and molecular biology. , his h-index is 158, according to Google scholar.

Doping

See also
 Doping in East Germany

References

Further reading

External links
Werner Franke – Member profile at The American Society for Cell Biology

1940 births
2022 deaths
20th-century German biologists
German molecular biologists
People from Paderborn
Heidelberg University alumni
Academic staff of Heidelberg University
Doping in sport
Doping cases in cycling
Members of Academia Europaea
Recipients of the Cross of the Order of Merit of the Federal Republic of Germany